Sang Pemimpi is a 2009 Indonesian film adapted from the popular same titled novel by Andrea Hirata. Directed by Riri Riza and starring Vikri Septiawan, Ahmad Syaifullah, Azwir Fitrianto and Zulfanny. The film premiered on December 17, 2009 in Jakarta.

Cast
Vikri Septiawan as Ikal
Rendy Ahmad as Arai
Azwir Fitrianto as Jimbron
Maudy Ayunda as Zakiah
Mathias Muchus as Seman
Rieke Diah Pitaloka as Ikal
Nugie as Balia

External links
 

2009 films
Indonesian drama films
2000s Indonesian-language films
Films shot in Indonesia
Films directed by Riri Riza